{{safesubst:#invoke:RfD||2=Christian Biblical Council|month = February
|day = 28
|year = 2023
|time = 21:49
|timestamp = 20230228214914

|content=
REDIRECT The Way International

}}